Julie Beth Ertz (born April 6, 1992) is an American soccer player for the United States women's national soccer team. She first appeared for the United States national team during an international friendly against Scotland on February 9, 2013. She has since made more than 100 total appearances for the team.

Ertz played collegiate soccer with the Santa Clara University Broncos from 2010 to 2013. Following her collegiate career, Ertz was selected third overall by the Chicago Red Stars in the 2014 NWSL College Draft that took place on January 17, 2014. Ertz helped the United States win their titles at the 2015 and 2019 FIFA Women's World Cup. At 23, she was the second youngest member of the 2015 team behind 22-year-old Morgan Brian. The United States went on to the World Cup final where she played every minute of all seven games of the tournament and was subsequently named to the FIFA Women's World Cup All-Star Team.

After moving to center midfield for club and country in 2017, Ertz was awarded U.S. Soccer Female Player of the Year.
Ertz was again nominated for U.S. Soccer Female Player of the Year in 2018 and won the U.S. Soccer Female Player of the Year in 2019.

Early life
Born in Mesa, Arizona, to Kristi and David Johnston, Ertz was raised with her sister Melanie Johnston. Julie was introduced to soccer through her local AYSO region. The Johnston sisters played for Sereno Soccer Club in Phoenix; Julie played for the 1992 side and Melanie played for the 1990s. Regarding Julie's switch to the team, Ertz stated that "it ended up being the best decision [she's] ever made." Sereno was a nationally known club with alumni that have gone on to play in college, on professional teams and for national teams. Ertz played with the team from 2004 to 2010 on the U13 through U19 teams. She won the state title nine times during her time there and was captain of the team.

Ertz attended Dobson High School in Mesa from 2006 to 2010, where she volunteered as a student athletic trainer all four years. She never played for the soccer team at the school, instead opting to devote her time to playing for Sereno. While at Dobson, Ertz was a member of the National Honor Society.

Santa Clara Broncos, 2010–2013
Ertz attended Santa Clara University, where she majored in communications and played as a midfielder for the Broncos women's soccer team. In 2010, as a college freshman, she played in 20 games, starting 16 and accumulating 1,519 minutes of playing time. At the end of the season, she led the team in assists with five and recorded the third-most shots on the team with 31. She was named WCC Freshman of the Year and received NSCAA All-West Region Second-Team, Soccer America All-Freshman First-Team, All-WCC Second-Team, and WCC All-Freshman team honors.

As a sophomore in 2011, Ertz started all 21 games with nine goals and four assists for the Broncos. She scored four game-winning goals in matches away to Cal Poly, and at home to WSU, Cal and Nevada. She was a WCC Hermann Trophy semi-finalist and was named to the NSCAA All-American First-Team as well as the All-WCC First-Team.

In 2012, which was her junior year, Ertz started 14 of the 15 games she played and led the Broncos with eight goals and was second on the team with five assists. She scored three game-winning goals and recorded an assist in the first round of the NCAA Women's Soccer Tournament in a match against Long Beach State. She was subsequently named to the All-WCC First Team and NCAA Division I Women All-West Region First Team. She was a MAC Hermann Trophy semi-finalist and was named U.S. Soccer Young Female Athlete of the Year.

In 2013, Ertz played in 22 games and led the team with eight assists and four game-winning goals. She made a total of 12 goals in the season and recorded an assist in the first round of the NCAA Women's Soccer Tournament in a match against University of California at Berkeley. At the end of the season, she was named to the NSCAA All-American First Team, NSCAA All-West Region First Team, All-WCC First Team and College Sports Madness All-WCC First Team. She was also named WCC Player of the Year and College Sports Madness WCC Player of the Year. Overall, Ertz made 79 appearances and scored 31 goals with the Broncos.

Club career

Chicago Red Stars, 2014–2021
On January 17, 2014, Ertz was selected third overall in the first round of the 2014 NWSL College Draft by the Chicago Red Stars. She subsequently signed with the team for the 2014 season. She made her first appearance for the team on April 19 in a match against the Western New York Flash. She scored the only goal of the match in the 59th minute. In the 2014 season, Ertz started in 21 matches and scored two goals. The Red Stars finished fifth in the regular season with a 9–7–8 record and did not advance to the playoffs. Ertz was named NWSL Rookie of the Year following the 2014 season.

In 2015, Ertz missed almost half of the NWSL season due to commitments with the United States women's national team at the FIFA Women's World Cup in Canada. She returned to the Red Stars on July 22 during a match against the Boston Breakers, which ended in 2–1 victory for the Red Stars. She made 11 appearances for the Red Stars during the 2015 season, playing 990 minutes. The Red Stars finished second in the regular season with an 8–3–9 record and advanced to the playoffs. The Red Stars faced FC Kansas City in the semi-finals of the playoffs on September 13. Ertz started in the match, which ended in a 0–3 defeat for the Red Stars and they were eliminated from the playoffs. Following the 2015 season, Ertz was named to the NWSL Best XI.

Ertz made twelve appearances for the Red Stars during the 2016 season before joining the national team in preparation for the 2016 Summer Olympics in Rio de Janeiro.

In the 2017 season, Ertz debuted in a new role in attacking midfield, scoring the winning goal in a 1–0 victory over FC Kansas City in week 2. Ertz was named to the NWSL Second XI for the season after leading Chicago to the championship semi-final, where they lost out for the third consecutive season.

Ertz missed the beginning of the 2018 NWSL season as she was recovering from a knee injury suffered at the 2018 SheBelieves Cup. She made her first appearance of the season on April 28 in a 1–1 draw against the Washington Spirit. Ertz played in 15 games for the Red Stars in 2018 as they qualified for the playoffs for the fourth straight season. The semi-final was a rematch with the North Carolina Courage; Chicago lost 2–0 which was their fourth consecutive semi-final loss. Ertz was named the 2018 NWSL Second XI.

At the end of the 2019 season, Ertz and the Chicago Red Stars made their first appearance in the NWSL Championship against the North Carolina Courage.

On December 3, 2021, Ertz's rights were traded to Angel City FC ahead of the upcoming expansion draft.

International

Youth national teams
In 2006, Ertz attended the United States U14 National Identification Camp. In 2009, she was called into a U18 national team training camp from May 30 to June 7 at The Home Depot Center in Carson, California.

In 2012, Ertz competed in international under-20 youth soccer and scored a goal against Switzerland at the La Manga Tournament in Spain. Heading into the 2012 FIFA U-20 Women's World Cup, she had 13 caps and four goals for the U20 team. Ertz captained the United States team to the Japan 2012 U20 FIFA Women's World Cup; winning the 2012 CONCACAF Under-20 Women's Championship along the way. In the main tournament, one of the goals she scored was in the 4–0 semi-final victory over Mexico that advanced the United States to the World Cup finals. In Japan, Ertz captained her team to win the FIFA under-20 world cup, and won the Bronze Ball award herself.

In 2013, Ertz played for the U23 team in the Four Nations Tournament in La Manga, Spain. The team won the tournament, beating England in the final on March 7.

Senior national team

First caps, 2013–2014
Ertz was first called up to the national team in January 2013, when she was on the 29-player roster for a training camp leading up to two matches against Scotland in early February. Ertz made her first appearance for the national team in their first match of the year on February 9, 2013, against Scotland. She came in for Becky Sauerbrunn in the 83rd minute to help the United States win the match 4–1.

Ertz traveled to Europe with the national team for matches against Germany and the Netherlands in early April. On April 9, Ertz started in the midfield in the match against the Netherlands. Ertz scored in the 73rd minute but the referee ruled that she was offside and the goal was called back. The United States won the match, 3–1. In late May, Ertz was named to the 21-player roster that traveled to Canada to train in preparation for a match against Canada on June 2. She did not appear in the match.

Ertz started off 2014 at a national team training camp from January 8 to 15 at U.S. Soccer's National Training Center in Carson, California. Ertz was not named to the roster for the 2014 Algarve Cup in March. In late April, Ertz was named to a 22-player roster for a match against Canada on May 8. She was then named to the roster for two games against France on June 14 and 19. Ertz was named to a 19-player roster for a match against Switzerland on August 20 in Sandy, Utah. She came in for Sauerbrunn in the second half and the United States went on to win 4–1.

Ertz joined the national team for a training camp at the end of August in order to prepare for two matches against Mexico in September as well as the 2014 CONCACAF Women's qualifying tournament in October. Initially, she was not named to the roster for the 2014 CONCACAF Women's Championship that served as a qualification for the 2015 FIFA Women's World Cup. However, one day before the team's first match of the tournament, Ertz replaced an injured Crystal Dunn on the roster. The United States qualified for the 2015 FIFA Women's World Cup after a semi-final win against Mexico on October 24. Following the CONCACAF Qualifying tournament, Ertz was named to the 24-player roster for the International Tournament of Brasília in Brazil that took place from December 10 to 21. Ertz made one appearance in the opening game of the tournament on December 10 against China, which resulted in a 1–1 draw. The final game against Brazil was a 0–0 draw, but the tournament title was given to Brazil, who had more points from the group stage.

2015 FIFA Women's World Cup

Ertz started off 2015 at a 21-day training camp from January 5 to 25 at the U.S. Soccer National Training Center in Carson, California. Following the training camp, she was named to the 24–player team that would travel on a 13-day trip to Europe for matches against France and England in mid-February. On February 21, Ertz was named to the 25-player roster for the 2015 Algarve Cup in Portugal. She started three matches of the tournament, including in the final against France on March 11. During the game, Ertz scored her first international goal in the 7th minute to help the United States defeat France 2–0 to win the tournament.

On April 14, Ertz was named to the 23-player roster that would represent the United States at the 2015 FIFA Women's World Cup. She was one of the five United States players that played every minute in all seven matches for the United States during the World Cup. In the 59th minute of the team's semi-final match against Germany on June 30, Ertz pulled down opposition player Alexandra Popp inside the penalty box and was given a yellow card. Celia Sasic took the subsequent penalty kick but missed the net. The United States went on to win the match 2–0 to advance to the World Cup final. In the final, the United States faced Japan on July 5. In the 52nd minute, Ertz attempted to block a free kick but instead scored an own goal. However, the United States still went on to win the match and the World Cup title. Following the tournament, Ertz was named to the FIFA Women's World Cup All-Star Team. She joined the national team on a Victory Tour following their World Cup win that started in Pittsburgh, Pennsylvania on August 16 and ended in New Orleans, Louisiana on December 16.

2016 Rio Olympics

Ertz joined the national team for their first training camp of the year at the U.S. Soccer National Training Center in Carson, California from January 5 to 21. She was then named to the 20-player roster for 2016 CONCACAF Women's Olympic Qualifying tournament. The United States qualified to the 2016 Olympic Games in Rio de Janeiro after a semi-final win against Trinidad and Tobago on February 19. The United States won the tournament after defeating Canada 2–0 on February 21.

Ertz was named to the roster for the 2016 SheBelieves Cup that took place from March 3 to 9. She came in for Alex Morgan in the 80th minute of the team's opening match of the tournament on March 3 against England. She also made appearances in other two matches of the tournament, helping the United States win the 2016 SheBelieves Cup with a 2–1 win over Germany in their final game.

Ertz joined a 23-player roster for a training camp ahead of two matches against Colombia in early April. In the second match on April 10, Ertz played all 90 minutes and scored two goals to help the United States defeat Colombia 3–0. Ertz was on the roster for another two-game series against Japan in early June. She started in both games and scored a goal in the 27th minute of the second match on June 5.

On July 12, Ertz was named to the 18-player team that would represent the United States at the 2016 Olympic Games in Rio de Janeiro. She made her Olympic debut on August 3 in the team's opening match against New Zealand, a 2–0 victory. She did not appear in the team's remaining two group matches due to a sore groin. She returned for the team's quarterfinal match against Sweden where she played the full game, which the U.S. would go on to lose in penalty kicks.

2019 FIFA World Cup
Beginning in 2017, Ertz was shifted from center back to a defensive center midfield position as coach Jill Ellis experimented with new formations. She found success in the role and in 2017 she was named the U.S. Soccer Female Player of the Year.

In May 2019, she was named to the final 23-player roster for the 2019 FIFA Women's World Cup in France, marking her second World Cup appearance.
She scored in the 3–0 win over Chile. Ertz also won US Soccer's Female Player of the Year award. She was nominated alongside teammates Rose Lavelle, Carli Lloyd, Alex Morgan, Alyssa Naeher and Megan Rapinoe.

2020 SheBelieves Cup
At the first SheBelieves Cup competition on March 5, 2020, Ertz played her 100th match for the United States in a 2–0 win against England.

Personal life
Ertz is a Christian. In February 2016, she became engaged to NFL tight end Zach Ertz at Klein Field, the Stanford University baseball stadium where they first met. They were married on March 26, 2017, on the coast of Santa Barbara, California. Zach and Julie Ertz were featured in ESPN The Magazine's Body Issue 2017. In April 2022, they announced they were expecting their first child. Their son Madden Matthew Ertz was born on August 11, 2022.

In popular culture

Video games
Ertz was featured along with her national teammates in the EA Sports' FIFA video game series in FIFA 16, the first time women players were included in the game and has been included in every EA Sports FIFA title since.

Ticker Tape Parade and White House honor
Following the United States' win at the 2015 FIFA Women's World Cup, Ertz and her teammates became the first women's sports team to be honored with a Ticker tape parade in New York City. Each player received a key to the city from Mayor Bill de Blasio. In October of the same year, the team was honored by President Barack Obama at the White House.

Player statistics

World Cup appearances

Olympic appearances

International goals

Honors and awards
College
 WCC Freshman of the Year: 2010
 NSCAA All-West Region Second Team: 2010
 Soccer America All-Freshman First Team: 2010
 All-WCC Second Team: 2010
 WCC All-Freshman Team: 2010
 NSCAA All-American First Team: 2011, 2013
 All-WCC First Team: 2011, 2012, 2013
 Preseason All-WCC: 2011
 Top Drawer Soccer Team of the Year: 2012
 NCAA Division I Women All-West Region First Team: 2012
 NSCAA All-West Region First Team: 2013
 WCC Player of the Year: 2013
 College Sports Madness WCC Player of the Year: 2013
 College Sports Madness All-WCC First Team: 2013
United States U20
 CONCACAF U-20 Women's Championship: 2012
 FIFA U-20 Women's World Cup: 2012
United States
 FIFA Women's World Cup: 2015, 2019
 CONCACAF Women's Championship: 2014, 2018
 Olympic Bronze Medal: 2020
 CONCACAF Women's Olympic Qualifying Tournament: 2016; 2020
 SheBelieves Cup: 2016; 2018; 2020, 2021
Tournament of Nations: 2018
Algarve Cup: 2015
Individual
 U.S. Soccer Female Player of the Year: 2017, 2019
 U.S. Soccer Young Female Athlete of the Year: 2012
 CONCACAF Women's Championship Golden Ball: 2018
 CONCACAF Women's Championship Best XI: 2018
 IFFHS Women's World Team: 2019
 Best NWSL Player ESPY Award: 2021
 FIFA FIFPro Women's World XI: 2015, 2019
 NWSL Rookie of the Year: 2014
 NWSL Best XI: 2015
 NWSL Second XI: 2016, 2017, 2018

See also
 2012 FIFA U-20 Women's World Cup squads

References

Match reports

External links

U.S. Soccer player profile
Santa Clara player profile
Jule Ertz on the NWSLsoccer website

1992 births
2015 FIFA Women's World Cup players
American women's soccer players
Chicago Red Stars players
Living people
Santa Clara Broncos women's soccer players
Soccer players from Phoenix, Arizona
United States women's international soccer players
FIFA Women's World Cup-winning players
Women's association football defenders
National Women's Soccer League players
Footballers at the 2016 Summer Olympics
Footballers at the 2020 Summer Olympics
Chicago Red Stars draft picks
Angel City FC players
United States women's under-20 international soccer players
Sportspeople from Mesa, Arizona
2019 FIFA Women's World Cup players
FIFA Century Club
Olympic bronze medalists for the United States in soccer
Medalists at the 2020 Summer Olympics